Joseph Alfred Hardcastle (1815–1899) was an English Liberal politician who sat in the House of Commons variously between 1847 and 1885.

Life
Hardcastle was born at Clapham, London, the son of Alfred Hardcastle of Hatcham House, New Cross (then in Surrey) and the grandson of Joseph Hardcastle. He was educated at Mill Hill School and the Grammar School at Bury St Edmunds. He then studied at King's College, London and, after matriculating at Wadham College, Oxford, at Trinity College, Cambridge where he obtained a scholarship in 1836. He was also admitted at the Inner Temple on 2 December 1837 and called to the Bar on 11 June 1841. He was a Cambridge Apostle.

He was a Deputy Lieutenant for Surrey and a Justice of the Peace for Essex, Norfolk and Suffolk.

Hardcastle was elected at the 1847 general election as Member of Parliament (MP) for Colchester, but was defeated in 1852.  At the 1857 general election he was elected for Bury St Edmunds, and held the seat until his defeat at the 1874 general election.

He was re-elected at the 1880 general election, but when the borough's representation was reduced to one seat for the 1885 general election, he was defeated by the Conservative candidate, and did not stand again.

Hardcastle died at Woodlands, Beaminster, Dorset at the age of 83.

Family
Hardcastle married firstly Frances Lambirth, daughter of H. W. Lambirth of Writtle on 24 February 1840, and had issue. He married secondly Hon. Mary Scarlett Campbell, daughter of Lord Chancellor Campbell.

References

External links 
 

1815 births
1899 deaths
People educated at Mill Hill School
Alumni of King's College London
Alumni of Wadham College, Oxford
Alumni of Trinity College, Cambridge
Liberal Party (UK) MPs for English constituencies
UK MPs 1847–1852
UK MPs 1857–1859
UK MPs 1859–1865
UK MPs 1865–1868
UK MPs 1868–1874
UK MPs 1880–1885
People from Clapham
Members of the Inner Temple